Sholokhovsky District is an administrative and municipal district (raion), one of the forty-three in Rostov Oblast, Russia. It is located in the north of the oblast. Its administrative center is the rural locality (a stanitsa) of Vyoshenskaya. Population: 27,294 (2010 Census);  The population of Vyoshenskaya accounts for 33.9% of the district's total population.

History
The district was called Vyoshensky until 1984, when it was renamed in honor of author Mikhail Sholokhov, a Nobel Prize-winner, who was from Vyoshenskaya and died earlier that year.

References

Notes

Sources

Districts of Rostov Oblast
